Trușești is a commune in Botoșani County, Western Moldavia, Romania. It is composed of six villages: Buhăceni, Ciritei, Drislea, Ionășeni, Păsăteni and Trușești.

Natives
 Demostene Botez

References

Communes in Botoșani County
Localities in Western Moldavia